The Welsh House on 5th Ave., NW, in Mandan, North Dakota was built in 1918.  It has also been known as Ness House.  It was listed on the National Register of Historic Places in 1980.

It is a working-class home that was built by Robert M. Welsh, "a brakeman and conductor for the Northern Pacific Railroad from 1896 to 1938."

References

Houses on the National Register of Historic Places in North Dakota
Houses completed in 1918
Houses in Morton County, North Dakota
National Register of Historic Places in Morton County, North Dakota
1918 establishments in North Dakota
Mandan, North Dakota